Trestonia is a genus of longhorn beetles of the subfamily Lamiinae, containing the following species:

 Trestonia albilatera (Pascoe, 1859)
 Trestonia assulina Bates, 1874
 Trestonia bilineata Martins, Galileo & Tavakilian, 2008
 Trestonia capreola (Germar, 1824)
 Trestonia ceara Dillon & Dillon, 1946
 Trestonia confusa Dillon & Dillon, 1946
 Trestonia exotica Galileo & Martins, 1990
 Trestonia fasciata Martins & Galileo, 1990
 Trestonia forticornis Buquet, 1859
 Trestonia frontalis (Erichson, 1847)
 Trestonia fulgurata Buquet, 1859
 Trestonia grisea Martins & Galileo, 1990
 Trestonia lateapicata Martins & Galileo, 2010
 Trestonia morrisi Martins & Galileo, 2005
 Trestonia nivea Martins & Galileo, 1990
 Trestonia pulcherrima Dillon & Dillon, 1946
 Trestonia pyralis Dillon & Dillon, 1946
 Trestonia rugosicollis Martins, Galileo & de Oliveira, 2009
 Trestonia signifera Buquet, 1859
 Trestonia turbula Monné & Fragoso, 1984

References

 
Onciderini